Peter Rasmussen Hallock (November 19, 1924, Kent, Washington – April 27, 2014, Fall City, Washington) was an American organist, choirmaster, liturgist, countertenor, and composer and arranger of church music (anthems, hymns, psalm settings, and music for the Episcopal liturgy). Though he occasionally gave concerts, lectures, and seminars around the United States, his career was centered in Seattle, Washington. From 1951 to 1991 he served as organist and choirmaster at St. Mark's Cathedral, Seattle, during which he was conferred the title of Canon Precentor, the first layperson in the Episcopal Church (United States) to be so honored. Later, he served as organist at St. Clements (Seattle) until 2013. He also founded the Compline Choir from its predecessor chant study group in 1956; he led the choir until 2009. He never married.

Biography

After WWII, when he was discharged from the Army, Hallock pursued organ studies at the University of Washington, and also studied at the Royal School of Church Music. In 1986, with Carl Crosier, he founded Ionian Arts, a music publishing business.

Selected Compositions
 Psalms 134 & 4 
 Psalm 23 
 Psalm 91 
 Psalm 139 
 Bring Us, O Lord God 
 Draw On Sweet Night 
 Easter Canticle 
 If We Could Shut the Gate 
 Ionian Psalter  
 Lamentations of Jeremiah 1: 1-2 
 The Lord Is My Light 
 Peace 
 Phoenix 
 To the Supreme Being 
 Ye Choirs of New Jerusalem

Notes

References
The Life and Works of Peter R. Hallock (b. 1924), Doctoral Dissertation by Jason Anderson, DMA, 2007
Prayer As Night Falls Companion material to the book by long-time member of the Compline Choir, Kenneth Peterson
An interview with Peter Hallock, Video interview conducted in August 2013 at Peter's home, with session footage of the Byrd Ensemble singing three of Peter's compositions

External links
Obituary from the Compline Choir
Obituary from the Seattle Times
Obituary from the Seattle Post-Intelligencer (Caution: contains factual errors)

American church music
1924 births
2014 deaths
American male composers
American composers
American male organists
People from Kent, Washington
University of Washington College of Arts and Sciences alumni
American organists